Strata Tower at Oklahoma Commons is a prominent skyscraper in the central business district of downtown Oklahoma City, in the U.S. state of Oklahoma. It was the headquarters of gas production and exploration company SandRidge Energy Corporation. In January 2010, SandRidge announced a $100 million renovation, designed by Rogers Marvel Architects, for the building and four other buildings to be called SandRidge Commons. In 2012,

In September 2020 the State of Oklahoma purchased the building and renamed it to the Oklahoma Commons. In June 2021, it was renamed to Strata Tower at Oklahoma Commons.

After the state government departments moved in, government workers criticized the complex for not being accessible to people with a disability. The complaints have focused on parking and other issues.

History
Until 2008, the building was known as the Kerr-McGee Tower. The former oil and gas company Kerr-McGee Corporation constructed the building in 1971 and the tower served as its corporate headquarters. The Kerr-McGee building was sold to Chesapeake Energy in August, 2006 after Kerr-McGee Corp was acquired by Anadarko Petroleum. Chesapeake Energy then sold the building to SandRidge Energy in July, 2007.

Architecture
The building received a "25-Year Award of Excellence" from the American Institute of Architects, Oklahoma Chapter, in November 1999. In 1991, architects Frankfurt-Short-Bruza Associates were recognized as "Firm of the Year" by the American Institute of Architects' Central Oklahoma chapter. The renovation and adjacent buildings were honored in 2012 by the American Institute of Architects.

Gallery

Tenants
Oklahoma Tax Commission
Oklahoma State Department of Health

See also
List of tallest buildings in Oklahoma City

References

See also
List of tallest buildings in Oklahoma City

Oil company headquarters in the United States
Office buildings completed in 1971
Buildings and structures in Oklahoma City
Skyscraper office buildings in Oklahoma City